Chah Mish may refer to:

 Chah Mish, Fars, Iran; a village
 Chah Mish, Kerman, Iran; a village